Gar Kandi may refer to:
 Gar Kandi, Khuzestan (گركندي - Gar Kandī)
 Gar Kandi, Sistan and Baluchestan (گار کندي - Gār Kandī)
 Gar Kandi Rasul Bakhsh Bazar, Sistan and Baluchestan Province